Several ships of the Royal Navy have been named HMS Foresight:
 
 , a prototype "race-built" galleon of 1570, broken up in 1604
 , a 40-gun fourth-rate ship of 1650
 , a  scout cruiser that served in World War I
 , an F-class destroyer sunk in World War II
 

Royal Navy ship names